In immunology, activation is the transition of leucocytes and other cell types involved in the immune system. On the other hand, deactivation is the transition in the reverse direction. This balance is tightly regulated, since a too small degree of activation causes susceptibility to infections, while, on the other hand, a too large degree of activation causes autoimmune diseases.

Factors
Activation and deactivation results from a variety of factors, including cytokines, soluble receptors, arachidonic acid metabolites, steroids, receptor antagonists, adhesion molecules, bacterial products and viral products.

See also
Immune system

Immunology